Moray Hunter (born 6 October 1957, Hawick, Scotland) is a Scottish comedian, writer and performer. He starred in the Channel 4 sketch show, Absolutely. Alongside Jack Docherty he played one half of the eccentric double-act, Don and George, in Absolutely and later in the spin-off series, Mr. Don and Mr. George. Moray also provided the voice for a shadow puppet in one of Aardman Animations' short films, Humdrum.

As a writer, Moray has contributed to Smack the Pony, Alas Smith and Jones, Spitting Image, The Lenny Henry Show, The Clan and the animated series of Meg and Mog; and on radio to Radio Active and Alone.

External links
 
 Biography on Absolutely.biz

References

Living people
Scottish male comedians
1958 births
People from Motherwell